Plamen Maslarov (1 January 1950 – 8 June 2010) was a Bulgarian film director and theater director, who served as the head of the Bulgarian National Film Archive from 2004 until 2010.

Maslarov was born in 1950. He graduated from National Academy of Theater and Film Arts in Sofia in 1974 with a degree in drama theater directing.

References

External links

1950 births
2010 deaths
Bulgarian film directors
Bulgarian theatre directors